Daniela Soto-Innes is a Mexican-born chef and the youngest chef named World's Best Female Chef by the World's 50 Best Restaurant. Born in Mexico City, Mexico to two lawyers, she moved to Texas at the age of 12. She was a competitive swimmer until she was 20.  She studied at Le Cordon Bleu in Austin, Texas and then trained in both Europe and New York under chefs Danny Trace, Chris Shepherd and Enrique Olvera. In 2014, she helped to open Cosme in New York City, serving there as the Chef de Cuisine. In 2017, in partnership with chef Enrique Olvera, she opened the restaurant Alta.

Awards 
In 2016, she received the James Beard Award for Rising Star Chef. In 2019, she was named the World's Best Female Chef at the World's 50 Best Restaurant Awards.

Travel Channel named her one of the ten up and coming chefs to look out for based on her work at Cosme in 
Manhattan.

References

Women chefs
Living people
Chefs from Mexico City
Mexican emigrants to the United States
Year of birth missing (living people)
Alumni of Le Cordon Bleu